Kongsvang tram stop is a tram station serving the district of Viby in the city of Aarhus in Jutland, Denmark. The tram stop is located on the Odder Line between Aarhus and Odder, part of Aarhus Letbane (Aarhus light rail). The Fredericia-Aarhus Line passes through the station. Until 2016 this was a railway halt, part of Aarhus Nærbane. From 2016 to 2018, the station was temporarily closed along with the Grenaa Line while being reconstructed  and electrified to form part of the Aarhus light rail system.

See also 
 List of railway stations in Denmark

External links

 Aarhus Letbane

Railway stations in Aarhus